The Polish–Turkish War of 1485–1503 was a prolonged conflict, rather a series of conflicts, between the Kingdom of Poland and the Ottoman Empire. The conflict formally lasted eighteen years, but during this time hostilities were ceased on several occasions due to temporary treaties being signed between the warring parties.

In the war the Kingdom of Poland was supported by its fiefs, the Duchy of Mazovia and the State of the Teutonic Order, as well as the Grand Duchy of Lithuania. The Ottoman Empire on the other hand, was allied with the Crimean Khanate and by the Principality of Moldavia during the Moldavian Campaign of 1497–1499.

For most of the 15th century, Moldavia was a vassal of Poland, but at the same time other states, notably the Kingdom of Hungary and the Ottoman Empire together with the Crimean Khanate, tried to subdue Moldavia. After the Fall of Constantinople (1453), the Turks directed their expansion northwards, towards the lower Danube and behind the mighty river, which also threatened Poland.

Outbreak of the war 
In 1485, Ottomans captured the Moldavian Black Sea ports Akkerman and Kilia. This undermined Polish eastern trade. The king promised help, calling pospolite ruszenie and the Crown army, together with mercenaries. In November 1485, Poles commanded by Jan Karnkowski entered Moldavia, defeating some Tatar forces. John Albert himself prepared an anti-Ottoman raid in 1487, but had to change these plans and sent his forces to fight Tatars, allied with the Ottomans. On September 8, 1487, the Battle of Kopystrzyn in Podolia took place, in which the Tatars were defeated.

On March 23, 1489, a two-year truce was signed between Poland and Ottoman Sultan Bayezid II. In this truce, Casimir IV recognized the Ottoman possession of Kilia and Akkerman, a violation of his suzerainty over Moldovia, leading Stephen III of Moldovia to renounce Poland and seek Ottoman suzerainty. On January 25, 1491 the Battle of Zaslaw in Volhynia took place, in which Polish forces destroyed a Tatar raid.

In 1494 King John began military preparations for a new raid, despite a three-year truce, signed on April 6 of that year. Moldovian ruler Stephen III refused to join the Polish effort, fearing that Moldavia would become the battleground between the Ottomans and Poles. Instead, he sought Ottoman assurance of support if the Poles invaded Moldavia. It took Poland three years to complete preparations. Their army was made of Polish Crown forces, aided by a number of foreign mercenaries, 400 Teutonic Knights under Grand Master Johann von Tieffen, and a 600 strong unit from Mazovia. Altogether, the Polish army was some 40,000 strong, with 200 cannons.

Fearful of an alliance between Moldavia, Muscovy and the Ottomans, the Polish sought to make a preemptive strike to capture Moldavia; the Lesser Poland nobles especially Polish Ruthenians in particular demanded war to eliminate the Tatar raiding threat and seize access to the eastern trade. Polish units of pospolite ruszenie gathered in May–June 1497 in Podolia, and in early August of that year, the army crossed the Dniestr river, entering Moldavia.

On 1497, Poland began its Moldavian Campaign of 1497–1499. On September 24, the Polish army began the siege of Suceava, which was a failure, and on October 19 the Poles began to retreat. A week later, on October 26, the Poles were defeated in the Battle of the Cosmin Forest. The campaign ended in 1499 in a Moldovian victory.

The Polish raid provoked Ottomans and Tatars, with the aid of Stephen of Moldavia, to invade the southeastern corner of Poland. This took place in spring 1498: after crossing the Dniestr, the invaders ransacked Red Ruthenia, capturing thousands of people and reaching as far as Przeworsk. In the summer of that year, the Tatars again invaded Poland, mainly Podolia and Volhynia.

Truce 
On July 13, 1498, John Albert signed a treaty with the Kingdom of Hungary, in which both sides agreed to cooperate against the Ottomans. On August 15, 1499, Stephen III accepted the truce, and on October 9, 1503, King Alexander I Jagiellon signed a five-year peace treaty with Sultan Bayezid II.

See also 
 Polish–Ottoman Wars

References

Sources 
 Roman Grodecki, Stanislaw Zachorowski, Jan Dabrowski, Dzieje Polski Sredniowiecznej, t. 2, Kraków 1995. 
 Henryk Lowmianski, Polityka Jagiellonów, Poznan 2006.

Wars involving Moldavia
Wars involving Poland
Wars involving the Ottoman Empire
Wars involving the Grand Duchy of Lithuania
Wars involving Wallachia